Paul Sills (born Paul Silverberg; November 18, 1927 – June 2, 2008) was an American director and improvisation teacher, and the original director of Chicago's The Second City.

Life and career
Sills was born Paul Silverberg in Chicago, Illinois, to a family who believed in the teachings of modern-day Judaism. His mother was teacher and writer Viola Spolin, who authored the first book on improvisation techniques, Improvisation for the Theater. Spolin in turn was the student of play therapy theorist Neva Boyd.

In 1948, Sills enrolled in the University of Chicago, where he established himself as a director, co-founding Playwright's Theater Club. There, with fellow actors Edward Asner, Byrne Piven and Zohra Lampert, they blended Spolin's improvisational techniques with established theater training.

In 1955, Sills and David Shepherd founded the Compass Players, the first improvisational theater in the United States, where he directed Shelley Berman, Mike Nichols and Elaine May. In 1959, Sills, along with partners Howard Alk and Bernie Sahlins, opened a theatre called The Second City where revues developed improvisationally were presented under Sills's direction. With early cast members Alan Arkin, Barbara Harris, Severn Darden, Mina Kolb and Paul Sand, success led to New York (a brief run on Broadway and a long one off-Broadway), London and world recognition.

Career
Sills left Second City in 1965 to form the Game Theater, where he coached improvisational techniques of his mother, Viola Spolin, in performance, and audience participation was encouraged. His mother and other community friends were partners. The Parents School was co-founded there, with wife Carol Bleackley Sills and others, with a children's curriculum based on group art forms and play. It operated for almost two decades. At the Game Theater, he also discovered a new form he called Story Theater, which debuted at 1848 N. Wells Street, during the summer of 1968.  That building was the original location of the Second City, which had already moved to its new and current location at 1616 N. Wells St.  After Sills finished doing Story Theater there, it was torn down. Story Theatre went on to play at the Yale Repertory Theatre, in Los Angeles and on Broadway, remaining the form Sills explored for the rest of his life. His book, Paul Sills' Story Theater: Four Shows.

Sills's first two wives were Dorothea Horton and Barbara Harris.

In 2011, he was posthumously inducted into the American Theater Hall of Fame.

Death
Paul Sills died on June 2, 2008 at the age of 80, at his home in Baileys Harbor, Wisconsin, of complications from pneumonia.

References

External links
Paul Sills' Wisconsin Theater Game Center
"The Second City" founder Paul Sills dies at 80

1927 births
2008 deaths
American theatre directors
Drama teachers
Deaths from pneumonia in Wisconsin
Male actors from Chicago
People from Baileys Harbor, Wisconsin
University of Chicago alumni
The Second City